Curtains is a 1983 Canadian slasher film directed by Richard Ciupka and Peter R. Simpson, written by Robert Guza Jr., and starring John Vernon, Samantha Eggar, Linda Thorson, and Lynne Griffin. Centered on theater and filmmaking, its plot focuses on a group of actresses auditioning for a role in a movie at a prestigious director's mansion, where they are targeted by a masked killer.

Conceived by producer Peter R. Simpson after his box office hit Prom Night (1980), the film was intended to be an "adult" slasher aimed at older audiences in contrast to the standard genre films of the time, which featured predominately teenaged characters. Shooting began in late 1980 and was the beginning of a troubled production marked by multiple rewrites and reshoots that spanned nearly three years. The film's protracted production ended in Ciupka detaching his name from the project.

The film premiered in the United States on March 4, 1983, and was released theatrically in Canada the following year to extremely negative reviews. Though a critical and box-office failure, the film became a staple of late night television. The film developed a cult following around the 2000s, with fans petitioning for an official DVD release. It had its first DVD and Blu-ray release by Synapse Films in 2014.

Plot 
Samantha Sherwood, a beautiful actress and muse for director Jonathan Stryker, has herself committed to an asylum as a preparation for the titular role of a mentally unstable woman in a film called Audra. Once inside, she finds out that Stryker has left her there alone and lets a group of young girls audition for the role of Audra instead. Furious at being double-crossed, Samantha escapes the asylum to seek revenge.

One of the candidates, fledgling actress Amanda Teuther, has a weird dream. While driving to the audition, she spots a large doll in the middle of the road. When she leaves her car to move it, it grabs her hand as someone gets into her car and runs over her. After she wakes up from her dream, a killer in a hag mask stabs her to death and takes her doll.

The next day, the other five women auditioning for the part of Audra arrive at Stryker's mansion: comedian Patti O'Connor, veteran actress Brooke Parsons, ballet dancer Laurian Summers, musician Tara DeMillo, and professional ice skater Christie Burns. The caretaker is named Matthew. Samantha, the uninvited guest, appears at the house during dinner. The girls spend their first night getting to know each other. Tara has sex with Matthew in a jacuzzi as Stryker seduces Christie. Then, an unseen figure enters the tool shed, grabs a sickle, and sharpens it.

The next morning, Christie goes to a nearby pond for ice skating. She notices a small hand protruding out of the snow and uncovers a doll. The masked killer with the sickle appears and attacks Christie. The killer manages to wound her, but Christie is able to momentarily incapacitate the killer, escaping into the woods. As she rests against a tree, the killer appears from behind and viciously decapitates her.

Later that day, a drunk Matthew rides away on a snowmobile in search of Christie. Patti is given an impromptu audition with Stryker and nearly explodes with anger when he mocks her ability to act, not even giving her a chance to start. While Tara and Laurian are practicing, Brooke discovers Christie's severed head in a toilet bowl. She frantically informs Stryker of what she has seen, but when they go back to the bathroom, the toilet is empty. Exploiting Brooke's vulnerability, Stryker seduces the frightened actress. Meanwhile, Tara and Patti ponder Brooke's reason for claiming that Christie is dead, suspecting foul play. Later on, while Laurian is dancing in her room upstairs, the killer sneaks in and stabs her to death.

After having sex, Brooke and Stryker are both shot dead by a figure in a robe. They fall from the second floor, with Stryker's body crashing through a window downstairs. Tara subsequently discovers the bodies of Brooke and Stryker, as well as Matthew, who had been murdered off-screen. She attempts to flee the property but discovers the cars inoperable and covered in snow. Panicked, she takes shelter in Stryker's expansive prop shed, where she discovers Laurian's body among the hanging mannequins and is pursued by the killer. The killer ambushes Tara three times and she is able to fight them off, before hiding in a ventilation duct. Thinking she has outsmarted the killer, Tara begins to climb out of the duct, only to be pulled back in and murdered with an axe, her screams echoing throughout the prop shed.

A short time later, Samantha and Patti drink champagne in the kitchen, discussing Audra's insanity. Samantha tells Patti about Stryker's treachery for having abandoned her. She also admits to having killed Stryker and Brooke. Patti seems disappointed and angered by Samantha's confession, before revealing she had murdered the other women to win the role of Audra. She then proceeds to stab Samantha to death. Afterward, Patti is revealed to have been committed to a mental hospital, where she performs a monologue from "Audra" for the patients, who pay her no mind.

Cast

Production

Conception 
Producer Peter Simpson had wanted to make another successful slasher film after the release of Simcom's Prom Night, which had been a major box-office success. Wanting to avoid the "failure of teenybopper horror films such as Terror Train", Simpson signed onto the Curtains project because the film was "aimed for an adult audience."

Casting 
John Vernon was cast in the role of Jonathan Stryker, a part that had originally been considered for Klaus Kinski. British actress Samantha Eggar was cast as Samantha Sherwood; Eggar stated she thought the characters in the film were "vaguely drawn", the end result "awful", and she took the role chiefly for the work and salary. Director Ciupka recalled being "very intimidated" by Eggar: "She hardly spoke...  she was a big-time actress...  But there was never a problem and she was very good with everything.

Lynne Griffin, who had previously appeared in the slasher film Black Christmas (1974), was cast in the role of Patti, the stand-up comic, and at the time had been working in local theater productions in Toronto. Originally, Celine Lomez was cast in the role of Brooke Parsons, but she was replaced by Linda Thorson after producer Simpson fired her.

Filming 
Principal photography for Curtains began November 10, 1980, on location in Muskoka, Ontario,  and Toronto, Ontario, Canada, on a budget of $3.7 million. As a result, two sets of credits grace the ending of Curtains, divided between "Act I" and "Act II", denoting the two different, protracted production periods. Eventually, numerous crew members had to be rehired to shoot footage to complete the film.

Curtains''' troubled production stemmed from a clash between the film's director, Richard Ciupka, and Simcom producer Peter Simpson. Ciupka envisioned the film as more of an arthouse thriller, whereas Simpson wanted a more commercial slasher film, of the type in vogue at the time. According to actress Linda Thorson, at one point, the tension between the two became so intense, it caused many of the actors to feel uncertain whether the production would even move forward at all.

In preparation for the film's ice-skating sequence, actress Lesleh Donaldson was sent for skating practice by the film's producers. She had very little prior training in the field and even had fellow actress Anne Ditchburn help with her choreography. Nevertheless, when filming for that scene commenced, Donaldson tripped on the uneven ice and injured herself, resulting in a stand-in double being used for her long shots.

 Re-shoots 
Director Ciupka left the film after disagreements with producer Simpson over stylistics and tone. At the time Ciupka abandoned the project, only 45 minutes of the film had been shot, which resulted in Simpson having to take over the shoot. The final chase scene in the prop house was filmed by Simpson over a year after the initial production, as was the ending murder scene between Samantha Eggar and Lynne Griffin. Writer Robert Guza Jr. returned to the project for rewrites under Simpson's supervision. This resulted in various additional scenes being shot, many of which never made it into the final picture.

Deleted scenes included a backstory sequence where, prior to arriving at Stryker's retreat, Christie is emotionally rejected by her skating coach. This scene was intended to show the character's vulnerability when she is rejected again, this time by Stryker. The scene was shot two years after the initial production on a college campus, but never made it into the final cut.

Actors Michael Wincott and Anne Ditchburn also originally had more dialogue, but most of their lines were cut from the final version of the film. Wincott's death was originally filmed with him being killed on a snowmobile and then crashing into the library, scaring Sandee Currie's character. This scene was cut out of the film, and he is, instead, killed off-screen in a hot tub.

An alternate ending of the film was shot in Toronto. In this scene, Lynne Griffin's character Patti O'Connor delivers a monologue on a theater stage surrounded by her dead victims. This alternate ending was not used in the final cut of the film. According to Michael MacLaverty, film editor for "Curtains, the alternate theater ending was ultimately discarded because Alana Simpson, then wife of producer Peter Simpson, felt it was "too improbable." "[Alana] couldn't really accept the fact that all these corpses were somehow dragged together [by the killer] and put on a stage somewhere," recalls MacLaverty.

 Release 
After the film was completed in 1982, director Ciupka detached his name from the final cut, and the film's director is credited as "Jonathan Stryker", the name of John Vernon's character. With a production spanning nearly three years, Curtains was released theatrically in the United States on March 4, 1983, and in Canada on September 14, 1984. No official premiere for the film was done, though star Lynne Griffin recalled going to see the film on its opening night at a theater on the Lower East Side in Manhattan. The film was released in Italy as The Mask of Terror and as Death Count to Seven in Norway.

 Critical response The New York Times gave Curtains a middling review, saying: "This derivative Canadian thriller plays like a distaff version of Samuel Fuller's cult classic Shock Corridor fused rather crudely to a standard mad-slasher plot." Film critic Leonard Maltin also gave the film a negative review, calling it a "Badly conceived and executed horror opus." The Hollywood Reporter, however, gave the film a positive review, calling it "the classiest, most chilling thriller to come along in quite a while… rich in surprises of a gripping, sensuous nature." Joe Baltake of the Philadelphia Daily News noted that Vernon "projects a genuine aura of menace" and that Eggar is "saddled here with a character that looks like a practical joke by her agent," summing up the film: "The movie itself is never a mystery, never frightening, but is, instead, unrelievedly solemn, given to long, mournful pauses." Rick Brough of the Park City Newspaper ranked the film two stars out of five, adding: "Don't bother using logic to figure out whodunit. The movie cheats shamelessly. Outwitting the dumb script in Curtains may be the only challenge in this waste."

Linda Gross of the Los Angeles Times summarized the film as a "mediocre and grotesque Grand Guignol horror movie," criticizing its depiction of violence against women. Stephen Hunter, writing for The Baltimore Sun, noted that "the most affecting thing about Curtains is its melancholy subtext of failed career and unrealized aspirations," but concluded: "Only the presence of several slick professional actorsSamantha Eggar and John Vernonand some glossy production values separate this pointless, thoroughly meretricious film from the cruder, rawer teenage hacker melodramas that it so resembles."

Although it was largely ignored by the press, it has gained a cult following over the years, and garnered a series of positive reviews when it was released for the first time on Blu-ray in July 2014. Brian Orndorf of Blu-ray.com noted the film's haphazard construction, but praised its visuals, writing:

Curtains isn't a single film, it's a handful of subplots and ideas competing for screentime under the guise of a traditional '80s-style slasher endeavor. Bizarre seems too mild a description when discussing this movie, which is actually stitched together from two production periods spread out over three years, with the original director, Richard Ciupka, taking his name off the effort when producer Peter R. Simpson elected to jazz up the rough cut with customary slicing and dicing. The fascinating backstory on Curtains is evident throughout the presentation, leaving the picture half-realized, shooing away substance to plow ahead with violence. It's a mess, but an entertaining one thanks to Ciupka's visual ambition and ensemble work from the oddball cast, who deliver the proper level of hysteria to assist what little suspense remains.

Dustin Putman of The Film File gave the film three out of four stars, writing: "the picture doesn't always play by conventional slasher rules and its more surrealistic aspects render it all the more fascinatingly esoteric." Paul Chambers of the film website Movie Chambers gave the film a mixed review, praising Eggar and Vernon's performances as well as the oft-remembered ice-skating sequence, while also noting the film as "[so] directionless and improbable, that no payoff is worth it." Film historian Jim Harper also gave the film a mildly positive review, summarizing: "There are some real touches of class and originality in Curtains, but the poor editing and erratic feel stops the film from being a slasher classic. Even so, it's a thoughtful and interesting movie." John Kenneth Muir also praised the film, writing that "the murder scenes are staged with ingenuity," and noting that the film's "form nicely echoes its content."

 Home media Curtains was first released on VHS by Vestron Video in 1984.

Throughout the early 2000s, a DVD release for the film never manifested, leading fans to start an online petition for a DVD release.

The film eventually was released on DVD on October 5, 2010, by Echo Bridge Home Entertainment as part of the Midnight Horror Collection: Bloody Slashers DVD collection, which also includes Secrets of the Clown, Hoboken Hollow, and Room 33, three direct-to-video B-movies from the 2000s. This release featured generic cover art and a poor transfer from VHS source material.

On July 29, 2014, Curtains was released on Blu-ray and DVD by Synapse Films, featuring a new 2K transfer from the original prints, as well as a 5.1 surround sound audio remastering. It features a retrospective "Making of" documentary and vintage documentary footage, an audio commentary, and the film's original theatrical trailer.

 In popular culture 
American death metal band Mortician used a sample from Curtains as an introduction for the song "Audra" from their 2003 album Darkest Day of Horror. Bassist / vocalist Will Rahmer has said in interviews that Curtains'' is one of his favorite films. Clips from the film were used in the music video for Oneohtrix Point Never's "Lost But Never Alone."

References

Sources

External links 
 
 

1983 films
1983 horror films
1980s mystery films
1980s slasher films
1983 thriller films
Canadian horror thriller films
Canadian independent films
Canadian mystery films
English-language Canadian films
Films scored by Paul Zaza
Films about actors
Films set in country houses
Films set in New Hampshire
Films shot in Ontario
Canadian slasher films
Films directed by Richard Ciupka
1980s English-language films
1980s Canadian films